is a 1997 role-playing video game developed by Sting Entertainment and published by ASCII Corporation for the Super Famicom.

Gameplay 

Criminals are fought in random encounters in various sections of the city. Healing items are used to fix the attack robot and can be bought at a special warehouse. The player must go to the correct district for crime fighting action and the game refuses to send the player to the district that he isn't authorized to be in. The combat is handled from a third-person perspective in which the player must select commands (using buttons and not a menu screen) in turn-based combat in an attempt to defeat the enemy's mech.

All dialogue in the game is in Japanese. The game takes place in a top-down perspective for the overworld. From there, the player can talk to NPCs and explore.

Plot 
Shuu is a detective in Metal City. He is engaged to the daughter of the Shadow Dragon organization's leader, Eileen. Despite his job, he still has to pinch pennies to keep his combat mech in working condition. His partner is Ion, who eventually becomes something of a love interest. Eileen is the daughter of the Shadow Dragon Organization's leader. She is engaged to Shuu.

The game takes place in a town known as Solid City, which despite being technologically advanced, is overrun with crime. Very few people dare to challenge the control of the underground mafias and street gangs that threaten the city. While the game has a continuous plot, players are urged to complete individual missions.

Release 
The game was released exclusively in Japan on March 28, 1997, late in the console's life span.

References

External links 

 Solid Runner at MobyGames

1997 video games
ASCII Corporation games
Detective video games
Japan-exclusive video games
Role-playing video games
Sting Entertainment games
Super Nintendo Entertainment System games
Super Nintendo Entertainment System-only games
Video games developed in Japan
Video games scored by Toshiaki Sakoda
Single-player video games